Óscar Horacio Torlacoff Acosta (born 22 December 1973) is a Uruguayan footballer who plays as striker with Liga Nacional de Honduras club Atlético Choloma.

He scored the Liga Nacional's 14,000th goal with a header on 17 September 2006 in the F.C. Motagua's 2-0 victory against Real C.D. España.

References

1973 births
Living people
Uruguayan people of Bulgarian descent
Uruguayan footballers
Club Nacional de Football players
Central Español players
Comunicaciones F.C. players
Atlético Choloma players
F.C. Motagua players
Hispano players
Liga Nacional de Fútbol Profesional de Honduras players
Honduran Liga Nacional de Ascenso players
Expatriate footballers in Guatemala
Expatriate footballers in Honduras

Association football forwards